PrimeTime Radio was a national UK radio station. It was once part of Saga Radio Group although it became independent in 2004.  It operated as a sister station to Saga Digital radio. The line up featured a variety of presenters including David Hamilton, Don Durbridge, David Allan, Dave Cash, Gavin McCoy, Tony Myatt and Sheila Tracy (who had been the main proponent of big band music on BBC Radio 2).  Music played on the station was easy and melodic from the past 6 decades. PrimeTime used jingles ("easily the best") that were reminiscent of those common in the mid-1960s (for example on the offshore Britain Radio).

PrimeTime radio won Best Digital Terrestrial Station 2004 at the Sony Radio Awards ceremony. A further mark of its success was that, uniquely at the time for a commercial all-digital music station, its programmes were listed in full in the BBC's Radio Times.

The Chairman of PrimeTime Radio, Roger De Haan announced in November 2005 that he was withdrawing PrimeTime Radio from DAB digital radio from May 2006 when its multiplex licence with Digital One ended. It continued on Sky channel 0132, NTL channel 871 and online at primetimeradio.org (and on DAB in Greater London and Northern Ireland) for a few weeks, carrying repeats of previous programming, before being withdrawn from these services on 2 June 2006.

New Zealand
The music format at PrimeTime Radio in UK inspired the establishment (by totally different people) of a low-power FM and Internet station in the Bay of Islands in New Zealand. Primetime Radio 1ZZ offered a broadly similar format to its British predecessor, along with repeats of classic US drama and serials and evening programmes of jazz and blues. This format was more common among New Zealand broadcasters than others. The New Zealand station featured specially produced American Sixties-style jingles by Ben Freedman, who originally worked at the famous PAMS studios in Dallas. The 'callsign' 1ZZ was reminiscent of the callsigns traditionally used in New Zealand radio until the mid-80s. If the callsign system had survived, 1ZZ would have been the last possible one to be issued in the upper part of the North Island.

See also
Boom Radio, a similar station aimed at the baby boomer generation

References

External links
 Original 'launch' press release from Saga
 Station details from Ofcom

Defunct radio stations in the United Kingdom